Kosovo competed at the 2020 Winter Youth Olympics in Lausanne, Switzerland from 9 to 22 January 2020.

Kosovo made it Winter Youth Olympics debut.

Alpine skiing

Gallery

See also
Kosovo at the Youth Olympics
Kosovo at the 2020 Summer Olympics

References 

2020 in Kosovan sport
Nations at the 2020 Winter Youth Olympics
Kosovo at the Youth Olympics